James Pratt Carter (August 20, 1915 – December 19, 2000) was an American military officer, politician, and educator. During his career in the United States Army, he served in World War II and the Korean War, retiring from the army in 1958 with the rank of lieutenant colonel. He was the mayor of Madison, North Carolina for twelve years and later served on the town's Board of Aldermen.

Early life 
Carter was born on August 20, 1915, in Rockingham County, North Carolina, to Yancey Ligon Carter and Mary Elizabeth Morton, who were prominent tobacco farmers in the Bethany community. He was the thirteenth of fifteen children. Carter was raised in the Baptist tradition. His grandfather, Pleasant Jiles Carter, was a North Carolinian planter. Carter's great-grandfather, Thomas B. Carter, owned a large tobacco plantation in what is now Wentworth.
 His family descends from the colonist Reverend Thomas Carter, a Puritan minister in the Massachusetts Bay Colony and signer of the Dedham Covenant.

Career

Military 
Carter enlisted in the United States Army as a private in 1934, after graduating from Madison High School. He served in World War II with the rank of staff sergeant, as part of the 20th Infantry Regiment, and was deployed to North Africa and Italy. He also served in the Korean War and was stationed in Japan. He was decorated for his service in World War II. During World War II, four of his brothers were also serving. His mother was awarded a "five-starred emblem" by the Legion of Honor Association for having five sons serve at one time. The award was presented at the President's Birthday Ball at the town armory. He retired from the army as a lieutenant colonel in 1958.

Education 
Carter graduated from Wake Forest College in Winston-Salem in 1961 with a degree in education. Carter later earned a master's degree from the University of North Carolina at Greensboro. He worked as a public school teacher at Madison-Mayodan High School, where he taught social studies. He was later appointed principal of Elliott Duncan Elementary School in Mayodan, a position he held until his retirement in 1977.

Politics 
In 1977 Carter was elected mayor of Madison. He assumed office in 1978 and served until 1991. In 1990 Carter dismissed Barry and Debbie Walker's charges of harassment against Phillip Webster, a town alderman, calling the charges a "personal vendetta" that the town "would no longer tolerate". The Walkers accused Webster of harassment when ordering bushes on their property bordering U.S. Route 311 be trimmed by town workers. Carter told them to contact the district attorney if they felt a crime had been committed. He also stated that, were Webster guilty of violating a town ordinance, it would not be grounds for removal from the town's Board of Aldermen.

In 1991 Carter supported a one-cent tax increase, to generate $273,000 annually as funding to maintain Chinqua Penn Plantation.

On March 6, 1991, Carter was a speaker at a victory march and rally for United States troops who served in the Gulf War. The demonstration, sponsored by the Rockingham County Patriots, was held at Rockingham County High School.

After his time as mayor, he served on town's Board of Aldermen for two years.

Personal life 
Carter was the uncle of folk artist Benny Carter and photographer Carol M. Highsmith. He was a Baptist and served as a deacon and trustee at First Baptist Church of Madison. He was a member of the Madison Lions Club and was named a Melvin Jones Fellow by the organization.

He married Nancy Elizabeth Martin in 1941. They had four daughters: Dorothy Jean Carter Seeman, Gerry Carter, Linda Carter Brinson, and Vicki Carter Alexander.

In 1998 Carter was named Madison's Citizen of the Year.

Carter died on December 19, 2000, at Stokes-Reynolds Memorial Hospital in Danbury, North Carolina. His funeral was held at First Baptist Church of Madison. He is buried in the cemetery at Sardis Primitive Baptist Church in Madison.

References 

1915 births
2000 deaths
20th-century American politicians
United States Army personnel of the Korean War
United States Army personnel of World War II
American people of English descent
American school principals
Schoolteachers from North Carolina
Baptists from North Carolina
Deacons
Mayors of places in North Carolina
North Carolina city council members
North Carolina Democrats
People from Rockingham, North Carolina
Thomas Carter family
United States Army officers
University of North Carolina at Greensboro alumni
Wake Forest University alumni
20th-century Baptists